Located in the township of Ladysmith, British Columbia on Vancouver Island, Ladysmith Secondary School is one of seven secondary schools in School District No. 68 (Nanaimo-Ladysmith). With a student population of 592 students, the school services grade 8–12. Ladysmith Intermediate and North Oyster Elementary are part of the Ladysmith Secondary School catchment area.

References

High schools in British Columbia
Educational institutions in Canada with year of establishment missing